Aziz Kandi may refer to:
 Aziz Kandi, Ardabil
 Aziz Kandi, East Azerbaijan
 Aziz Kandi, West Azerbaijan
 Aziz Kandi, Bukan, West Azerbaijan Province